Sergey Valentinovich Smirnov (born 17 September 1960 – 18 September 2003) was a Russian track and field athlete who competed in the shot put. He was a medallist at the IAAF World Indoor Championships in 1987 and at the European Athletics Indoor Championships in 1986 and 1987. Smirnov represented the Soviet Union at the 1988 Seoul Olympics and at the 1983 World Championships in Athletics.

Among his other honours were a gold medal at the 1986 Goodwill Games, a gold medal at the 1985 European Cup (in an unbeaten championship record), and a silver at the 1985 IAAF World Cup. He was a six-time Soviet champion. He ranks in the top fifteen all-time athletes for the shot put.

Career

Early life and Russian record
Born in Saint Petersburg (then Leningrad) in the Russian SSR, he began training in athletics at the Leningrad sports club. He won his first major international medal at the 1983 Summer Universiade, taking the bronze behind America's Mike Carter and Zlatan Saračević of Yugoslavia. At age twenty-two, he made his global senior debut for the Soviet Union at the 1983 World Championships in Athletics, though he failed to get past the qualifying round.

Smirnov made quick improvements in the 1985 season, establishing himself among the world's best shot putters. He beat Alessandro Andrei and Udo Beyer (both Olympic champions) to win the event. His throw was the second best ever by a Soviet athlete at that point, behind only the mark of  set by Sergey Kasnauskas the previous year. He remained in good form at the 1985 IAAF World Cup, taking the silver medal after Ulf Timmermann. Smirnov ranked second globally on performance that year behind Timmerman's world record throw.

Peak and indoor medals
He reached his athletic peak in the 1986 season. Internationally he won two medals that year. He was the silver medallist at the 1986 European Athletics Indoor Championships behind Swiss champion Werner Günthör. The Goodwill Games in Moscow brought him the second gold medal of his career, beating national rival Sergey Gavryushin and American John Brenner. He comfortably qualified at the 1986 European Athletics Championships, but picked up an injury and was unable to start the final, which was won by Günthör. He placed third in the world on distance that season after East Germany's Beyer (the new world record holder) and Timmermann. This was Smirnov's last top three outdoor ranking of his career.

He won a third straight national title in 1987 and also claimed his first win at the Soviet Indoor Athletics Championships. The indoor circuit was his focus that year and he claimed two bronze medals, first at the 1987 European Athletics Indoor Championships and then at the 1987 IAAF World Indoor Championships, placing behind Timmermann and Günthör at both events. It was six centimetres short of the Soviet record held by Sergey Kasnauskas (who took Belarusian citizenship after the dissolution of the Soviet Union).

Olympic debut and later career
He was defeated at the national championships by Gavryushin in 1988, but still gained selection for the Soviet Union at the 1988 Summer Olympics. At the 1988 Seoul Olympics he ranked fifth in qualifying but throw a little shorter in the final, resulting in an eighth-place finish for his only Olympic appearance. Smirnov won his last two Soviet national titles in 1990 and 1991 at the national indoor meet. He ranked second on distance indoors globally in both those years. He was ninth at the 1991 IAAF World Indoor Championships and also won a silver medal at the 1991 European Cup (his last major international medal).

Smirnov acquired Russian citizenship in 1992 and began competing intentionally for the newly independent nation. His only major appearance for Russia was the 1993 IAAF World Indoor Championships, where he placed seventh. He was the inaugural winner of the shot put at the Russian Indoor Athletics Championships that year.

Personal bests
Shot put outdoors –  (1986)
Shot put indoors –  (1987)

National titles
Soviet Athletics Championships
Shot put: 1985, 1986, 1987
Soviet Indoor Athletics Championships
Shot put: 1987, 1990, 1991
Russian Indoor Athletics Championships
Shot put: 1993

International competitions

References

External links

1960 births
2003 deaths
Athletes from Saint Petersburg
Russian male shot putters
Soviet male shot putters
Olympic athletes of the Soviet Union
Athletes (track and field) at the 1988 Summer Olympics
World Athletics Championships athletes for the Soviet Union
Universiade medalists in athletics (track and field)
Goodwill Games medalists in athletics
Universiade bronze medalists for the Soviet Union
World Athletics Indoor Championships medalists
Competitors at the 1986 Goodwill Games